Jennifer Cross (born 4 July 1992) is a Canadian volleyball player. She is currently a captain on the Canadian national volleyball team. She has also previously played professional volleyball across Europe. She was a 2 time All-American at the University of Michigan with a degree in Biomechanics (2010-2014). and the 2017 FIVB Volleyball World Grand Prix.

She played for the University of Michigan.

Clubs 
 2014-2015: Engelholm Volleyboll Sällskap - Sweden, 
 2015-2017: Dresden Sports Club - Germany
 2017-2018: UTE-Budapest, Hungary
 2018-2020: Maritza Plovdiv
 2020-2021: Yeşilyurt
 2021-2022: Panathinaikos
 2022-2023: CS Rapid București
 2023-: Panathinaikos

Titles

National championships
 2021/2022  Greek Championship, with Panathinaikos

National cups
 2021/2022  Greek Cup, with Panathinaikos

References

External links 
 
 
 http://worldgrandprix.2015.fivb.com/en/preliminary-round-group2/competition/teams/can-canada/players/jennifer-cross?id=44212

1992 births
Living people
Place of birth missing (living people)
Canadian women's volleyball players
Middle blockers
Michigan Wolverines women's volleyball players
Panathinaikos Women's Volleyball players
Expatriate volleyball players in the United States
Canadian expatriate sportspeople in Sweden
Expatriate volleyball players in Germany
Expatriate volleyball players in Hungary
Canadian expatriate sportspeople in Hungary
Canadian expatriate sportspeople in the United States
Canadian expatriate sportspeople in Germany
Canadian expatriate sportspeople in Bulgaria
Canadian expatriate sportspeople in Turkey
Canadian expatriate sportspeople in Greece
Expatriate volleyball players in Greece
Expatriate volleyball players in Turkey